Vote for the City (in Czech Volba pro město, VPM) is a tiny liberal party in the Czech Republic.

See also
Liberalism
Contributions to liberal theory
Liberalism worldwide
List of liberal parties
Liberal democracy
Liberalism in the Czech lands

External links
Vote for the City official site (in Czech)

Liberal parties in the Czech Republic
Regionalist parties in the Czech Republic